Gullholmen is a small island in Sweden's Orust Municipality. The island is notable for the absence of car traffic, and is serviced by a passenger ferry multiple times per day from the neighbouring island of Orust  Its  had 651 inhabitants in 1900.

References 

Populated places in Orust Municipality